Dan C. Jackart (born May 4, 1960, in Natal) is a Canadian former rugby union player who played as prop.

Career
At club level, Jackart played for the UBC Old Boys Ravens. He debuted for Canada on 11 May 1991, against Japan in Vancouver. He was also called up in the Canada team for the 1991 Rugby World Cup, playing 3 matches in the tournament. His last cap for Canada was against Fiji, in Nadi, on 8 April 1995.

References

External links
Dan Jackart international stats

1962 births
Living people
Sportspeople from British Columbia
Canadian rugby union players
Canada international rugby union players
University of British Columbia alumni
Rugby union props